The Old Post Office, also known as U.S. Post Office, is a historic post office building located at 121 Ellicott Street in Buffalo in Erie County, New York within the Joseph Ellicott Historic District. It is currently home to the City Campus of SUNY Erie.

History
It was designed by the Office of the Supervising Architect of the old U.S. Post Office Department during the tenure of Jeremiah O'Rourke when construction started in 1897. The $1.5 million building opened in 1901 during the tenure of James Knox Taylor and operated as Buffalo's central post office until 1963. 

The highly ornamented Gothic Revival style four story building features a 244-foot tower over the central entrance. The main feature of the interior is a roofed courtyard. It was subsequently occupied by various federal offices. 

Since 1981, it has been home to the City Campus of SUNY Erie. Burt Flickinger Center is across the street and provides athletic facilities for the college.

National Register of Historic Places
It was listed on the National Register of Historic Places maintained by the National Park Service of the U.S. Department of the Interior in 1972 as "U.S. Post Office".

Gallery

See also
List of tallest buildings in Buffalo

References

External links

U.S. Post Office - U.S. National Register of Historic Places on Waymarking.com

Erie Community College :: ECC Home

Historic American Buildings Survey in New York (state)
Buffalo
Gothic Revival architecture in New York (state)
Government buildings completed in 1901
Architecture of Buffalo, New York
National Register of Historic Places in Buffalo, New York
Skyscraper office buildings in Buffalo, New York